This is a list of seasons completed by the Dallas Stars team of the National Hockey League. This list documents the records and playoff results for all seasons the Stars have completed in the NHL since 1993. The franchise relocated in 1993 from Minnesota, where it was the Minnesota North Stars. Since moving to Dallas, the team has made the playoffs in seventeen of its twenty-eight seasons of play and have made five appearances in the Conference Finals, been to the Stanley Cup Finals three times and won the Stanley Cup once in 1999.

Table key

Year by year

1 Season was shortened due to the 1994–95 NHL lockout.
2 Season was cancelled due to the 2004–05 NHL lockout.
3 As of the 2005–06 NHL season, all games tied after overtime will be decided in a shootout; SOL (Shootout losses) will be recorded as OTL in the standings.
4 Season was shortened due to the 2012–13 NHL lockout.
5 Season was suspended on March 12, 2020 due to the COVID-19 pandemic.
6 Due to the COVID-19 pandemic, the 2020–21 NHL season was shortened to 56 games.

All-time records

References

 
seasons
National Hockey League team seasons
Dallas Stars